Carabus arcensis is a species of ground beetle in the family Carabidae. It is found in the Palearctic.

Subspecies Carabus arcensis arcensis is described as "a large granulate bronze or green ground beetle with a body length of 16-20 mm," and is found throughout the Palearctic.

Subspecies
These 11 subspecies belong to the species Carabus arcensis:
 Carabus arcensis arcensis Herbst, 1784
 Carabus arcensis baschkiricus Breuning, 1932  (Russia)
 Carabus arcensis conciliator Fischer von Waldheim, 1820  (Kazakhstan, Mongolia, and Russia)
 Carabus arcensis eremita Fischer von Waldheim, 1823
 Carabus arcensis faldermanni Dejean, 1830  (China, North Korea, and Russia)
 Carabus arcensis florianiellus Obydov & Saldaitis, 2008  (China)
 Carabus arcensis kargiensis Obydov, 2008  (Russia)
 Carabus arcensis klitini Obydov, 2007  (Russia)
 Carabus arcensis sachalinensis Lapouge, 1906  (Japan and Russia)
 Carabus arcensis sylvaticus Dejean, 1826  (Europe)
 Carabus arcensis venetianus Bernau, 1914  (Europe)

References

 Carabus (Eucarabus) arvensis Herbst, 1784 (Carabidae) - atlas of beetles of Russia

arcensis
Beetles of Europe
Beetles described in 1784